Wellington Pereira Rodrigues Adão (born 15 January 1993), commonly known as Well, is a Brazilian futsal player who plays as a pivot for Copagril and the Brazilian national futsal team.

References

External links
Liga Nacional de Futsal profile

1993 births
Living people
Brazilian men's futsal players
ADC Intelli players
People from Santo André, São Paulo
Footballers from São Paulo (state)